The smallscale hardyhead (Atherinason hepsetoides) is a species of silverside endemic to the Indian Ocean off the southern coast of Australia. It is the only known member of its genus.

References
 

Atherininae
Fish described in 1843